The 1935 VPI Gobblers football team represented Virginia Agricultural and Mechanical College and Polytechnic Institute in the 1935 college football season. The team was led by their head coach Henry Redd and finished with a record of four wins, three losses and two ties (4–3–2).

Schedule

NFL Draft selections

Players

Roster

Varsity letter winners
Twenty-one players received varsity letters for their participation on the 1935 VPI team.

References 

VPI
Virginia Tech Hokies football seasons
VPI Gobblers